The Bugatti Type 46 and later Type 50 were large enclosed touring cars and along with the Type 50B racing version, were all produced in the 1930s. Their relative ubiquity and numbers, combined with their styling caused them to sometimes receive the appellation of being a Molsheim Buick.

Type 46
The Type 46 used a 5.4 L (5359 cc/327 in³) straight-8 engine with 3 valves per cylinder driven by a single overhead camshaft.  Power was reported at 140 hp (104 kW).  The engine was undersquare like most Bugatti designs with an 81 mm bore and 130 mm stroke.

The Type 46 was a large car, weighing 2500 lb (1134 kg) and riding on a 138 in (3505 mm) wheelbase.  400 examples were produced from the end of 1929 through 1936. The three speed gearbox was in unit with the live rear axle, resulting in high unsprung weight, and a relatively harsh ride. Despite this, the model was a favourite of Le Patron, and it remained in production longer than might have been expected

Type 46S

A supercharged version, the Type 46S, was introduced in 1930.  With just 160 hp (119 kW), from its Rootes-type blower, it was not a great success.  18 supercharged cars were made in all.

Type 50

The Type 50 was a sporting coupe version of the Type 46.  It rode on a shorter wheelbase, 122 in (3099 mm), and used a smaller 5.0 L (4972 cc/303 in³) version of the engine.  This engine had squarer dimensions, however, at 86 by 107 mm, and twin camshafts actuated two valves per cylinder.  Power output was impressive at 225 hp (167 kW). Many cars had landaulet roofs and Bugatti-style two-tone paint.

Type 50T

The Type 50 Touring was a sedan version of the Type 50.  It used the same 138 in (3505 mm) wheelbase as its predecessor, the Type 46, but shared the 5.0 L engine of the Type 50.  The engine was tuned for torque, though, with just 200 hp (149 kW) on tap. In total, 65 Type 50 and Type 50T Bugattis were produced between 1930 and 1934.

Type 50B
A racing version, the Type 50B, was also produced.  It shared the 5.0 L 2-valve engine but was blown to produce . It was used from 1937 through 1939. A pair of these engines were installed in the Bugatti P100 airplane, with specially cast magnesium crankcases.

References 

46
24 Hours of Le Mans race cars
1930s cars